Donald Stewart Howard (4 February 1913 – 2 September 1980) was an Australian rules footballer who played with Essendon and South Melbourne in the Victorian Football League (VFL).

Notes

External links 
		

1913 births
Australian rules footballers from Victoria (Australia)
Essendon Football Club players
Sydney Swans players
Northcote Football Club players
1980 deaths